Timeless Muse was a jazz record label, a partnership between the Dutch label Timeless Records and the American label Muse Records. Most albums are c. 1979.

Discography
TI 301: Art Blakey – In My Prime Vol. 1
TI 302: Joanne Brackeen – AFT
TI 303: Lionel Hampton – Live in Emmen/Holland
TI 304: Tete Montoliu – Catalonian Folksongs
TI 305: Rein De Graaff – Dick Vennik Quartet – Modal Soul
TI 306: Cedar Walton, Billy Higgins, George Coleman, Sam Jones – Eastern Rebellion
TI 307: Louis Hayes, Junior Mance featuring Woody Shaw (with Ronnie Mathews, Stafford James, Guilherme Franco) – Ichi–Ban
TI 308: Rick Laird – Soft Focus
TI 309: Carter Jefferson – The Rise of Atlantis
TI 310: Free Fair – Free Fair
TI 311: Johnny Griffin / Art Taylor Quartet – The JAMFs are Coming!
TI 312: George Coleman / Tete Montoliu – Duo
TI 313: Mike Nock – In Out & Around
TI 314: Marion Brown – La Placita – Live in Willisau
TI 315: Eddie Marshall – Dance of the Sun
TI 317: Art Blakey & The Jazz Messengers – Reflections in Blue
TI 318: Cedar Walton, Billy Higgins, Bob Berg, Sam Jones – Eastern Rebellion 2
TI 321: Rein De Graaff Quintet – New York Jazz
TI 322: George Adams – Paradise Space Shuttle
TI 323: Rodney Jones– Articulation

External links
Discogs entry, incomplete

Jazz record labels
Dutch record labels
American record labels